Arno Assmann (30 July 1908 – 30 November 1979) was a German actor, film director and television writer. He committed suicide.

Filmography

As an actor 

 The Original Sin (1948)
 The Last Illusion (1949)
 My Wife's Friends (1949)
 The Orplid Mystery (1950)
 Harbour Melody (1950)
 Gabriela (1950)
 Decision Before Dawn (1951)
 Sensation in San Remo (1951)
 The Csardas Princess (1951)
 The Divorcée (1953)
 Rose-Girl Resli (1954)
 Homesick for Germany (1954)
 Hilfe – sie liebt mich (1956)
 Max the Pickpocket (1962)
  (1971, TV film)
 The Stuff That Dreams Are Made Of (1972)
  (1973, TV miniseries)
 Der Springteufel (1974; TV film)
  (1975, TV miniseries)
  (1978, TV series)

As a director 
 I Will Always Be Yours (1960)

References

External links 
 
 Staff (undated).  "Arno Assmann" (in German). steffi-line.de.  Retrieved 8 October 2013.
 Database (undated). "Arno Assmann" (in German).  filmportal.de.  Retrieved 8 October 2013.
 Staff (undated).  "Synchronsprecher Kurzporträts A" (in German).  deutsche-synchronsprecher.de.  Retrieved 8 October 2013.
 Photographs of Arno Assmann

1908 births
1979 deaths
20th-century German male actors
20th-century German writers
German mass media people
German male film actors
German male television actors
Actors from Wrocław
People from the Province of Silesia
Suicides by poison
Suicides in Germany
20th-century German male writers
1979 suicides